Jose Luis Olaizola is a writer. 

Born in San Sebastián, Spain in 1927, he was a lawyer for 15 years, until he found his vocation in writing. He has written novels such as La guerra del general Escobar which received the Premio Planeta of  1983. He also wrote Planicio which garnered the Premio Ateneo de Sevilla 1976. 

His book Cucho received the Premio de Literatura Infantil Barco de Vapor. Its French version received the Grand Prix de l'Academie des Lecteurs, Paris. 

Among his other works are:
El Cid, el último héroe;
Hernán Cortés, crónica de un imposible;
Bartolomé de Las Casas, crónica de un sueño;
Los amores de Teresa de Jesús;
Un escritor en busca de Dios;
Viaje al fondo de la esperanza
Más allá de la muerte.

His works that have been translated into English are: Journey to the Depths of Hope, My Spiritual Crossing, The Loves of Theresa of Jesus, The Fire of Love (about Saint John of the Cross). 

He also worked for film and has received international awards.  He wrote periodically for Telva, ABC, Mundo Cristiano, Ya, Ideal, El Noticiero Universal, Palabra, Colección Arvo, Alfa y Omega and other journals.

References

External links
 Casa de libros
Lecturalia
Jose Luis Olaizola

Spanish male writers
1927 births
Living people